Charles James Kinsolving III (January 14, 1904 – March 14, 1984) was an Episcopal prelate who served as Bishop of New Mexico and Southwest Texas from 1956 to 1972.

Early life and education
He was born in Brooklyn on January 14, 1904, to Charles James Kinsolving, Jr. and Edith Minturn Lewis. He was educated at Terrill Preparatory School in Dallas, Texas, and then at the Massachusetts Institute of Technology. He also attended the University of the South and graduated with a Bachelor of Arts in 1925 and a Bachelor of Divinity in 1930. He married Mary Virginia Robinson on August 2, 1932, and together had two children.

Ordained ministry
Kinsolving was ordained deacon in June 1928, and a priest in January 1929 by Bishop Harry Tunis Moore of Dallas. He served as curate at St Matthew's Cathedral in Dallas, Texas, between 1928 and 1929 and then priest-in-charge of the churches in Greenville, Texas, Denton, Texas, and Commerce, Texas, from 1929 to 1936. He was a member of the Kappa Sigma and Phi Beta Kappa. Between 1928 and 1936 he also served as chairman of the Student Work committee of the Episcopal Diocese of Dallas. From 1937 to 1938 he was chairman of the Department for Christian Education, and from 1938 as chairman of the Department of Christian Social Relations.

Bishop
In 1953, Kinsolving was elected Coadjutor Bishop of New Mexico and Southwest Texas and was consecrated on October 27, 1953, in St John's Cathedral by Bishop James M. Stoney. He succeeded Stoney as diocesan in 1956 and retained the post until his own resignation on January 14, 1972. He died on March 14, 1984, in Santa Fe, New Mexico, and was buried in Fairview Cemetery.

References

External links 
Diocesan history

1904 births
1984 deaths
20th-century American Episcopalians
Episcopal bishops of the Rio Grande
20th-century American clergy
Sewanee: The University of the South alumni